Claudia Pond Eyley (born 1946) is a New Zealand artist and filmmaker. Her works are held in the collection of the Auckland Art Gallery Toi o Tāmaki and Museum of New Zealand Te Papa Tongarewa.

Early life 
Claudia Pond Eyley was born in 1946 in Matamata, New Zealand.

Education 
Eyley has studied in Montreal, New York, and at the Auckland University Elam School of Fine Arts.

Career

Art 
She is a founding member of Visual Artists Against Nuclear Arms and a member of the Association of Women Artists. She has exhibited widely international and within New Zealand, including:
 Guest Artist, N.Z. Society of Sculptors & Painters Show in 1975
 Wellington City Art Gallery in 1985
 Unruly Practices at the Auckland City Art Gallery in 1993
She has completed mural commissions at Stokes Road (1980), Auckland University Arts Commerce (1984), Auckland High Court (1991), and collaborated with Pat Hanly for Flying Colours With Invention, Women's Suffrage Centennial collaborative project in Lorne Street (1993).

Films 
Eyley has directed four films including:
 Helen (2013), (co-directed with Dan Salmon) documentary about New Zealand's first elected woman Prime Minister, Helen Clark
 Kit & Maynie (2008), documentary about two 90-year-old peace activists who live on Waiheke Island in the Hauraki Gulf of New Zealand
 No Nukes Is Good Nukes! The Legacy of New Zealand's Grassroots Ant-Nuclear Movement (2007), documentary about New Zealand's Act of Parliament in 1987 which saw New Zealand become a nuclear free nation
 Departure and Return -The Final Journey of the Rainbow Warrior (2006), documentary about Greenpeace's ship, the Rainbow Warrior

Books 
Eyley co-authored the book Helen Clark - Inside Stories with Dan Salmon. She has illustrated three children's books with author Maris O'Rouke: Lillibutt's Big Adventure; Lillibut''s Te Araroa Adventure;<ref>{{Cite book|title=Lillibuts Te Araroa Adventure|last=O’Rourke|first=Maris|publisher=Duck Creek Press|year=2014|isbn=9781877378928}}</ref> and Lillibutt's Australian Adventure.''

References

Further reading 
Artist files for Claudia Pond Eyley are held at:
 Angela Morton Collection, Takapuna Library
 E. H. McCormick Research Library, Auckland Art Gallery Toi o Tāmaki
 Robert and Barbara Stewart Library and Archives, Christchurch Art Gallery Te Puna o Waiwhetu
 Fine Arts Library, University of Auckland
 Hocken Collections Uare Taoka o Hākena
 Te Aka Matua Research Library, Museum of New Zealand Te Papa Tongarewa
 Macmillan Brown Library, University of Canterbury
Also see: 
 Concise Dictionary of New Zealand Artists McGahey, Kate (2000) Gilt Edge

External links 
Official homepage

Living people
1946 births
New Zealand painters
New Zealand women painters
New Zealand documentary filmmakers
New Zealand illustrators
New Zealand children's book illustrators
New Zealand women illustrators
New Zealand writers
Elam Art School alumni
People from Mount Eden
People from Matamata
People associated with the Museum of New Zealand Te Papa Tongarewa
University of Auckland alumni
Women documentary filmmakers
People associated with The Group (New Zealand art)